The Ainsworth Baronetcy, of Ardnanaiseig in the County of Argyll, is a title in the Baronetage of the United Kingdom. It was created on 12 January 1917 for the industrialist, banker and Liberal politician John Ainsworth.

Ainsworth baronets, of Ardanaiseig (1917)
Sir John Stirling Ainsworth, 1st Baronet (1844–1923)
Sir Thomas Ainsworth, 2nd Baronet (1886–1971)
Sir John Francis Ainsworth, 3rd Baronet (1912–1981)
Sir (Thomas) David Ainsworth, 4th Baronet (1926–1999)
Sir Anthony Thomas Hugh Ainsworth, 5th Baronet (born 1962, succeeded to the title 1999)

The heir presumptive is Charles David Ainsworth (born 1966).

References

Ainsworth